Switch Player is a video gaming magazine that features news and columns regarding the Nintendo Switch, first released in January 2017. The monthly release of the magazine features a print run, as well as a free PDF release.

History
Switch Player was founded in 2016, by Paul Murphy, creator and lead editor of PlayStation Vita website and blog The Vita Lounge. Murphy created Vita Lounge due to the "lack of coverage" for the console in 2013. Before the release of the magazine, a patreon was set up for the magazine, with backers receiving an A5 printed version of the magazine, with a run of 500 versions being created for each issue. The first issue of the magazine was released on 31 January 2017.

The magazine would shortly after be represented on Metacritic, providing over 300 reviews in the first year of the magazines' run.

Features
Switch Player magazine includes interviews, reviews and features for upcoming games on the Nintendo Switch.

Notes and references

Notes

References

External links
 Official Switch Player Website
 Switch Player's profile on Metacritic
 Switch Player Magazine

Video game magazines published in the United Kingdom
Magazines about Nintendo
Magazines established in 2017
Monthly magazines published in the United Kingdom
Nintendo Switch